

Aaron Scheidies (Triathlete) 

Aaron Scheidies (born January 17, 1982) is an American male triathlete from Seattle, Washington. Despite dealing with a visual impairment for the entirety of his life, Aaron is a 13-time triathlon World Champion and an 11-time National Champion. He competed for the U.S. in the 2016 Paralympics.

References 

American male triathletes
1982 births
Living people
Paratriathletes of the United States